This is a list of cities, towns, unincorporated communities, counties, and other places in the U.S. state of Arizona, which start with the letter S. This list is derived from the Geographic Names Information System, which has numerous errors, so it also includes many ghost towns and historical places that are not necessarily communities or actual populated places. This list also includes information on the number and names of counties in which the place lies, its lower and upper ZIP code bounds, if applicable, its U.S. Geological Survey (USGS) reference number(s) (called the GNIS), class as designated by the USGS, and incorporated community located in (if applicable).

S–Sa

Sc–Sh

Si–So

Sp–St

Su–Sz

Notes

References